Senator DeGrow may refer to:

Alvin J. DeGrow (1926–2016), Michigan State Senate
Dan DeGrow (born 1953), Michigan State Senate